Dennis E. Franklin (born August 24, 1953) is a former professional American football player who was drafted by the Detroit Lions of the National Football League (NFL) in the 1975 NFL Draft.  Prior to playing for the NFL he played college football as a quarterback at the University of Michigan from 1971 to 1974.  He was the starting quarterback for the Michigan Wolverines from 1972 to 1974.  He was recruited by Michigan after starring for the Massillon High School football team in Ohio.  Franklin is known as Michigan's first black quarterback.

High school
Before attending the University of Michigan, Franklin drew attention as the talented quarterback of the 1970 Massillon High School Tigers football team.  With Franklin at quarterback, the Massillon Tigers outscored opponents, 412–29, and rushed for nearly 3,000 yards (including 363 yards by Franklin) in one season.  Franklin also passed for 699 yards, 21.2 yards per completion and 13 touchdowns.  The team was blessed with major college football talent.  He ran an offense that played eight future NCAA Division I players, including Steve Luke (Ohio State Buckeyes), Larry Harper (Miami Redskins, now RedHawks), Mike Mauger (Wisconsin Badgers, Kent State Golden Flashes) and Willie Spencer (World Football League).  Franklin's older brothers, Walter and Ed, had won state championships with Massillon.  In July 2007, he was inducted into the Stark County High School Football Hall of Fame.

College
After graduating from Massillon, Franklin wore #9 for the Michigan Wolverines football program from 1972 to 1974, and he became known as "Michigan's first black quarterback" in mass media:  "Every time I'd do an interview, they'd throw that tag on me. It became annoying," Franklin said. "Eventually, it went away. That's all I ever strived for."

Franklin was a member of the Michigan teams coached by Bo Schembechler from 1971 to 1974 and was the starting quarterback from 1972 to 1974.  Under Franklin’s leadership at quarterback, Michigan tied with Ohio State for three consecutive Big Ten Conference titles from 1972 to 1974 and finished with 30 wins, 2 losses and 1 tie.  Franklin was a First-team All Big Ten quarterback in 1974 and led the team in passing and total offense every year from 1972 to 1974, becoming the second player at Michigan since Tom Harmon to accomplish that feat for three consecutive years.

Franklin was voted team captain in 1974, was an Honorable Mention All American and finished sixth in the 1974 Heisman Trophy balloting. Franklin also won the 1974 Meyer Morton award, given by the M Club of Chicago for the football player show shows the greatest development and most promise as a result of spring practice and the 1972 John Maulbetsch Award, which is given to the freshman football candidate after spring practice on the basis of desire, character, capacity for leadership and future success both on and off the gridiron.

Franklin is remembered for his role in the classic 1973 Michigan vs. Ohio State football game.  When the teams met, both teams were unbeaten with Ohio State ranked No. 1, and Michigan No. 4.  Michigan had outscored its opponents 320–58, Ohio State by a margin of 361–33. After an epic struggle, the game ended in a 10–10 tie.  Ohio State had gone to the Rose Bowl the year before, which normally would have given Michigan the tie-breaker edge. After some deliberation, the Big Ten athletic directors picked the Buckeyes.  There were several explanations including that Franklin broke his collarbone in the game, that the Wolverines failed to win on their home field, and that Ohio State had entered the game as the higher ranked team.

Career passing statistics

Career rushing statistics

Professional career
Drafted by the Detroit Lions in the sixth round of the 1975 NFL Draft, Franklin converted to wide receiver for the 1975 NFL season. While Franklin was with Detroit, Greg Landry and Bill Munson were the Lions' quarterbacks. Franklin had a brief NFL career that lasted nine games and that totaled six catches over two years.

After retiring from football, Franklin rose to vice president at King World Productions in New York City, a television distributor that produced Wheel of Fortune, Jeopardy!, and Oprah. He now lives in Santa Monica, California and sells real estate.  Franklin's son Kenny followed his father to Michigan and has aspired toward acting with appearances in Cosmopolitan and S.W.A.T..

See also
 Michigan Wolverines football statistical leaders

References

External links
 

1953 births
Living people
American football quarterbacks
American football wide receivers
College football announcers
Detroit Lions players
Michigan Wolverines football players
Sportspeople from Massillon, Ohio
Players of American football from Ohio
African-American players of American football
21st-century African-American people
20th-century African-American sportspeople